The International Union of Hatters was a global union federation of trade unions representing people involved in making hats.

History
The various unions of hatters across Europe had long collaborated on support for workers moving between countries, and in 1878 representatives of the unions in Denmark, Germany and Italy all met at an exhibition in Paris to discuss the possibility of forming an international organisation.  No such federation was created, but further meetings were held in Paris in 1889, Zurich in 1893, and London in 1896.

The International Federation of Hatters was established in 1900, initially based in Paris.  Its headquarters moved to Altenburg in 1906, Monza in 1921, and back to Paris in the early 1930s.

One of the smaller global union federations, by 1925, it had 13 affiliates with a total of 57,077 members.  By 1936, it had affiliates in Belgium, Czechoslovakia, Denmark, France, Sweden, Switzerland and the United Kingdom.  It appears to have dissolved at the start of World War II.  After the war, the hatters' unions were admitted to the International Shoe and Leather Workers' Federation.

Affiliates
The following unions were affiliated as of 1922:

General Secretaries
1900: Joseph Espanet
1906: Alfred Metzschke
1921: Ettore Reina
1929: Position abolished

References

Global union federations
Hat makers' trade unions
Trade unions established in 1900
Trade unions disestablished in 1939